Pekka Sihvola (born 22 April 1984) is a Finnish professional footballer currently playing as a forward for IF Gnistan in the Finnish Kakkonen. He previously played for FC Honka, FC Hämeenlinna, FC Lahti, Haka, MyPa and HIFK. He has also represented the Finnish national football team.

In 2004 Sihvola and fellow footballer from Hämeenlinna, Panu Autio, had a trial at C.D. La Serena playing at top level of Chilean football. They also trained with C.D. Magallanes playing in the third level. They would have been the first Finnish footballers ever to play in the Chilean football league, but they were never given a professional contract and they both returned to Finland.

Sihvola is a striker with a keen eye for goal. In September 2012 Sihvola attracted world-wide fame for a training video posted online in which he scored a blindfolded Rabona penalty.

Honours

Individual
Veikkausliiga Player of the Month: August 2012

References

External links

http://www.fcviikingit.fi
http://www.fchameenlinna.fi
http://www.fchonka.fi

1984 births
Living people
Footballers from Espoo
Finnish footballers
FC Jokerit players
FC Honka players
FC Viikingit players
FC Lahti players
FC Haka players
Myllykosken Pallo −47 players
Veikkausliiga players
Klubi 04 players
HIFK Fotboll players
IF Gnistan players
Association football forwards
Finland international footballers